OCCC may refer to:

Education
Oklahoma City Community College, a two-year college in Oklahoma City, Oklahoma, United States
Orange County Community College, a two-year college in Orange County, New York, United States
Oregon Coast Community College, a two-year college in Newport, Oregon, United States

Government 
 Ohio Casino Control Commission, the gaming control board for casinos in Ohio
 Oahu Community Correctional Center, a jail in Hawaii
Texas Office of Consumer Credit Commissioner, a Texas state agency

Places
Orange County Convention Center, in Orlando, Florida